Minoru Tanaka (田中 実, Minoru Tanaka, born June 1, 1963, Kyoto Prefecture) is a Japanese racing driver.

Career 
Tanaka was active in automobile racing.

After playing an active part in the Japanese junior formula, he fully participated in the British Formula 3 Championship in 1990.  Future F1 drivers such as Mika Häkkinen, Mika Salo and Hideki Noda also participated in this race.  He returned to Japan the following year to compete in Japan's top formula.  When the All Japan GT Championship was launched, Tanaka also participated in this race.  He mainly participates in Toyota-affiliated teams and has also won the championship.  He retired from active duty in 2006 and is now the representative of an auto parts manufacturer.

Japanese Formula 3000 Championship results
(key) (Races in bold indicate pole position) (Races in italics indicate fastest lap)

JGTC/Super GT results
(key) (Races in bold indicate pole position) (Races in italics indicate fastest lap)

References 

1963 births
Living people
Japanese racing drivers